Cora Seton (born February 13, 1969) is a New York Times and USA Today bestselling author of contemporary romance novels. Her books have regularly ranked as iBooks bestsellers, and her book The Soldier's E-Mail Order Bride was one of Draft2Digital's bestselling self-published ebooks of 2014. Seton's Issued to the Bride One Sniper was one of BookBub's most highly rated books of 2017.

Selected works 
The Cowboys of Chance Creek series
 The Cowboy Inherits a Bride (March 2015)
 The Cowboy's E-Mail Order Bride (April 2013)
 The Cowboy Wins a Bride (May 2013)
 The Cowboy Imports a Bride (September 2013)
 The Cowgirl Ropes a Billionaire (November 2013)
 The Sheriff Catches a Bride (January 2014)
 The Cowboy Lassos a Bride (February 2014)
 The Cowboy Rescues a Bride (May 2014)
 The Cowboy Earns a Bride (October 2014)
 The Cowboy's Christmas Bride (November 2015)
The Heroes of Chance Creek series
 The Navy SEAL's E-Mail Order Bride (April 2014)
 The Soldier's E-Mail Order Bride (July 2014)
 The Marine's E-Mail Order Bride (October 2014)
 The Navy SEAL's Christmas Bride (December 2014)
 The Airman's E-Mail Order Bride (June 2015)
 A SEAL's Chance (August 2015)
The SEALs of Chance Creek series
 A SEAL's Oath (January 2016)
 A SEAL's Vow (June 2016)
 A SEAL's Pledge (October 2016)
 A SEAL's Consent (February 2017)
 A SEAL's Purpose (January 2018)
 A SEAL's Resolve (May 2018)
The Brides of Chance Creek
 Issued to the Bride: One Navy SEAL (November 2016)
 Issued to the Bride: One Airman (April 2017)
 Issued to the Bride: One Sniper (June 2017)
 Issued to the Bride: One Marine (November 2017)
Turners vs Coopers
 The Cowboy's Secret Bride (February 2018)
 The Cowboy's Outlaw Bride (April 2018)
Standalone Novels
 After the Fire (September 2015)
 Dare Me Again (June 2015)

References

External links 
 

American women novelists
1969 births
Living people
American romantic fiction novelists
Women romantic fiction writers
21st-century American novelists
21st-century American women writers